Napoleon Dynamite is a short-lived American animated sitcom based on the 2004 indie film of the same name. Set in the small town of Preston, Idaho, it follows the adventures of the titular 16-year-old boy, who thinks he is skilled at everything. The series was created by the film's co-writers and directors Jared and Jerusha Hess, who developed it with Mike Scully and proposed it to Fox.

The series received mixed to positive reviews; critics were divided on how well the source material translated to animation. The premiere episode had a Nielsen rating of 9.5 million viewers, but the ratings later dropped and the last four episodes averaged only 4 million viewers. The series ranked sixth in viewership among teenagers. The series aired on Fox's Animation Domination lineup from January 15 to March 4, 2012, before it was cancelled.

History
Married couple Jared and Jerusha Hess were co-writers and directors of the 2004 film Napoleon Dynamite, and had wanted to do an animated version since the film's release. They thought animation was the best way to continue the world of Napoleon Dynamite as the original actors had grown too old to play teenage characters. Following the film's success, Fox Searchlight Pictures wanted a sequel, but the Hesses delayed due to commitments to other projects and fear that audiences would tire of the Napoleon Dynamite characters.

Development of the series began in 2009 when Jared Hess met with writer-producer Mike Scully to propose an animated version of the film to him. Scully stated that "Napoleon Dynamite as an animated series made "perfect sense" to him, and the two presented a nine-minute pilot episode to Fox in 2010. That May, Fox officially confirmed that an animated series with the original cast was in development with close involvement from the Hesses. Fox placed an order for six episodes as a trial run, and in July 2011 ordered seven additional scripts to be put into production if the series was renewed for a second season. The show was overseen by the Hesses and Scully.

The series premiered on January 15, 2012, as a mid-season replacement for the animated series Allen Gregory. During its six-episode run, Napoleon Dynamite had no consistent schedule; it was constantly shifted on the Fox schedule in favor of football and award shows. On May 15, 2012, Fox announced a schedule for its 2012–13 season that dropped Napoleon Dynamite from the listings.

Premise

The Hesses set the series towards the end of the Napoleon Dynamite film; Scully said they transferred the characters and premise, but not the events of the film.

In the film, set in the small town of Preston, Idaho, Napoleon (Jon Heder) is an awkward 16-year-old boy who loves practicing ninja moves, dancing, and drawing pictures of a liger, an animal he says is bred for its skills in magic. He also invents stories about himself: hunting wolverines in Alaska, having an Oklahoman girlfriend, and that a gang wants him to join because of his skill with a bo staff. His brother Kip (Aaron Ruell) is an unemployed 32-year-old; flimsy and gawky, he is the target of Napoleon's outlashes, although he often brags of his wrestling abilities and overall coolness; he spends his days in an internet chat room talking to a woman named Lafawnduh. The two live with their grandmother, Carlinda (Sandy Martin), who enjoys riding all-terrain vehicles.

Deborah "Deb" Bradshaw (Tina Majorino) is a shy, quiet, sweet, and artistically inclined girl who is infatuated with Napoleon upon first meeting him. Napoleon's uncle Rico (Jon Gries) is a middle-aged man who lives in a camper van and is obsessed with his failed football career and with attempts at get rich quick schemes. Rex Kwon Do (Diedrich Bader) is a self-declared martial-arts master who runs a dojo.

Napoleon also becomes friends with a Mexican exchange student named Pedro Sánchez (Efren Ramirez) who rarely conveys emotion or speaks. Pedro runs for class president after seeing a poster at the school dance. On the election day, he gives a mediocre speech in front of the student body. Napoleon does a dance routine as Pedro's skit for the election and receives a standing ovation, saving the campaign and winning Pedro the election. Following the campaign, Kip and Lafawnduh meet each other in real life and are wed.

Jared Hess has stated that this series takes place after Pedro's election, but before the marriage, and several new characters are introduced.

Episodes

Reception
Reviews for the show's premiere episode were mixed. Linda Stasi of the New York Post praised its humor as almost as funny as the film, and Nancy Smith of The Wall Street Journal called it "a dream come true" for fans of the film. Ed Bark of UncleBarky.com enjoyed the show and said it was "far funnier" than the Fox animated comedies Bob's Burgers and Allen Gregory. Simon Moore of Flickering Myth compared the show's "left-field laughs" favorably to the humor in The Simpsons and Futurama. On Rotten Tomatoes, Napoleon Dynamite has an aggregate score of 32% based on 9 positive and 19 negative critic reviews.  The website’s consensus reads: "Unfunny and hackneyed, Napoleon Dynamite doesn't understand what made the movie popular in the first place."

David Wiegand of the San Francisco Chronicle found the writing not funny, writing that he could not see "Jon Heder's expressionless face" as he talked in the animation. The Staten Island Advance said the change to animation freed Napoleon from real-world limitations, but thought it "lessen[ed] the overall appeal of the character and setting". Lori Rackl of the Chicago Sun-Times did not like the movie and liked the animated series even less; she thought the emotions and physical humor were lost in the change to animation.

Brian Lowry of Variety gave the show a neutral review: "To say the show represents an improvement over Allen Gregory is not much of an endorsement, but there is something amusing about Heder's monotonic voice and Napoleon's utter lack of self-awareness, along with fast-paced gags like a miniature golf course where hitting the ball into Hitler's mouth wins a free round." Robert Bianco of USA Today called the first episode a "vulgarized premiere" that detracted from the film's qualities, but called the second one a "sweeter, funnier improvement". Mary McNamara of the Los Angeles Times wrote of the pacing that the "satirical silence or non-sequitur scenes slowly compiled to establish tone" in the film, but were sacrificed for the faster pace of a network TV show.

Simon Moore of Flickering Myth disagreed the faster pace was to the show's detriment, calling the film's "snail-like pace ... its biggest flaw".

Despite canceling the show, Fox touted in a press release that it had an averaged 2.8/7 Nielsen share and 5.8 million viewers for the six episodes, and that it ranked sixth in teenage viewership against other television networks. The show ranked #56 in the adults 18–49 ratings and #103 in the total viewership rankings for the 2011–12 television season.

Syndication
On August 20, 2015, Adult Swim Canada announced they would begin airing reruns of the series in September 2015.

The series is available on Hulu in the United States.

Home media
Napoleon Dynamite: The Complete Animated Series, containing all 6 episodes, was released on DVD in Region 1 on November 4, 2014 by Olive Films.

International broadcasting

References

Works cited

External links

Napoleon Dynamite
2010s American adult animated television series
2010s American high school television series
2010s American teen sitcoms
2012 American television series debuts
2012 American television series endings
American adult animated comedy television series
American animated sitcoms
English-language television shows
Fox Broadcasting Company original programming
Animated television shows based on films
Teen animated television series
Television series by Rough Draft Studios
Television series by 20th Century Fox Television
Television series by Fox Television Animation
Television shows set in Idaho